Silverstone is a village in Northamptonshire, England, United Kingdom

Silverstone may also refer to:

 Silverstone, North Carolina, an unincorporated community, United States
 Silverstone Circuit, a motor racing circuit near the village of Silverstone
 Silverstone Heliport, which serves the racing circuit
 Silverstone (plastic), a plastic coating, similar to Teflon
 Silverstone, the name of a "show within a show" on the TV programme The Famous Jett Jackson
 SilverStone Technology, a company that manufactures cases, power supplies, and cooling devices for personal computers
 Silvertone (album), common misspelling of the first album by Chris Isaak
 Healey Silverstone, a roadster made by Donald Healey Motor Company
 Silverstone Tire, tire company bought by Toyo

People with the surname
 Alicia Silverstone (born 1976), American actress
 Ben Silverstone (born 1979), British actor
 Lou Silverstone (1924–2015), American writer
 Arnold Silverstone, Baron Ashdown (1911–1977), British property developer

See also 
 Silverstein (disambiguation)